"Salud" (Spanish for "Health", used in the context of "cheers") is the tenth episode of the fourth season of the American television drama series Breaking Bad and the 43rd overall episode of the series. It originally aired on AMC in the United States on September 18, 2011.

Plot
Jesse Pinkman, Mike Ehrmantraut, and Gus Fring travel to Mexico to teach the Cartel how to cook high-quality meth. Although the cartel's chief chemist is initially skeptical because Jesse is a novice, the cartel is impressed when Jesse cooks a successful batch. Jesse is then horrified to hear that he belongs to the cartel, although Mike assures him that he will be returning home.

As a result of his fight with Jesse the previous night, Walt misses his son's birthday. Concerned, Walter Jr. pays him a visit, only to find him bloodied and on painkillers and alcohol. Walt blames it on gambling; he tearfully apologizes. The next morning, Walt finds Walter Jr. on his couch and apologizes for his drugged state, saying he does not want to be remembered that way after he has gone. However, Walter Jr. seems to be more satisfied with Walt's apparent truthfulness than his double life for the past year.

Skyler White convinces Saul Goodman to transfer $620,000 to Ted Beneke under the false story of an inheritance from a distant aunt. Instead of paying off the IRS, Ted uses the money to lease a new Mercedes Benz SL550 and restart his business, forcing Skyler to tell him that the money actually came from her.

Jesse, Mike, and Gus are brought to Don Eladio's residence where Hector killed Gus's partner Max decades ago. Gus and Eladio make peace, capped off with a bottle of rare tequila from Gus. As Eladio and his henchmen party, Gus goes to the bathroom and induces himself to vomit; the tequila was poisoned, and everyone who drank it dies. Gus had earlier taken an antidote, but is nevertheless affected, and his body begins failing as he tells the surviving henchmen that Eladio and his men are dead and they therefore no longer have a reason to fight. Most remaining cartel soldiers flee, but Joaquin Salamanca shoots and wounds Mike before being shot by Jesse. The trio escapes the residence.

Reception
Seth Amitin of IGN gave the episode a 10/10 ("Masterpiece") rating. Donna Bowman of The A.V. Club gave it an A− grade.

In 2019 The Ringer ranked "Salud" as the 20th best out of the 62 total Breaking Bad episodes.

Notes

References

External links
 "Salud" at the official Breaking Bad site
 

2011 American television episodes
Breaking Bad (season 4) episodes
Television episodes written by Peter Gould
Television episodes set in Mexico